Annas Fitranto (born April 6, 1994) is an Indonesian professional footballer who plays as a goalkeeper for Liga 2 club PSCS Cilacap, on loan from Liga 1 club PSM Makassar.

Club career

Persita Tangerang
He was signed for Persita Tangerang to play in Liga 2 in the 2019 season.

PSG Pati (loan)
In 2021, Fitranto signed a contract with Indonesian Liga 2 club PSG Pati, on loan from Persita Tangerang. He made his league debut on 4 October against PSCS Cilacap at the Manahan Stadium, Surakarta.

PSM Makassar
Fitranto was signed for PSM Makassar to play in Liga 1 in the 2022–23 season.

Honours

Club
Persita Tangerang
 Liga 2 runner-up: 2019

References

External links
 Annas Fitranto at Soccerway
 Annas Fitranto at Liga Indonesia

1994 births
Living people
Indonesian footballers
People from Malang
Sportspeople from Malang
Sportspeople from East Java
Indonesian Premier Division players
Liga 1 (Indonesia) players
Liga 2 (Indonesia) players
Persekam Metro players
Persepam Madura Utama players
Perseru Serui players
Persita Tangerang players
PSG Pati players
PSM Makassar players
PSCS Cilacap players
Association football goalkeepers